Lionheart is the sixteenth studio album by heavy metal band Saxon released in 2004. It is the only studio album featuring drummer Jörg Michael.
The title is inspired from Richard the Lionheart, a 12th-century King of England.  "Beyond the Grave" was released as a single and a video. The album was re-released on 17 February 2006 in digipak format (limited to 10,000 copies) with a bonus DVD-Audio featuring previously unreleased material, videos, rough mixes and a new 5.1 / 96 K mix of the whole album, as well as a Saxon keyholder and a patch.

Track listing

Lyrical concept

 "Witchfinder General" is about persecuting witches during the Interregnum era. The song also mentions methods of interrogation and execution favoured by 'Witchfinder General' Matthew Hopkins.
 "Lionheart" is about Richard the Lionheart, King of England from 1189 to 1199.
 "Beyond the Grave" is about death and afterlife.
 "To Live by the Sword" is about the way of life of samurai.

Personnel
 Biff Byford – vocals
 Paul Quinn – guitar
 Doug Scarratt – guitar
 Nibbs Carter – bass guitar, keyboards
 Jörg Michael – drums
 Chris Stubley – keyboards on "Lionheart"

 Production
 Charlie Bauerfeind – producer and engineer
 Biff Byford – executive producer
 Paul R. Gregory – cover design
 Sandra Hiltmann, SPV graphics – booklet design

Charts

References

2004 albums
Saxon (band) albums
SPV/Steamhammer albums
Albums produced by Charlie Bauerfeind